Fionna & Cake or Fionna and Cake may refer to:

 "Fionna and Cake", an episode of the animated series Adventure Time
 Adventure Time: Fionna and Cake, an upcoming animated series and spin-off of Adventure Time
 Fionna and Cake (comic series), a comic book series based on Adventure Time